Express Airways d.o.o. was a Slovenian airline headquartered in Maribor and based at Maribor Airport with a German branch, Express Airways GmbH, located in Düsseldorf. It mainly operated seasonal leisure flights from Germany to Croatia, Spain and Italy.

History
Express Airways was founded in 1999, operating Fokker F27 Friendship, Short 360 and Airbus A300 aircraft configured as freighters on behalf of FedEx. In 2012, Express Airways also founded a flight training school in Slovenia. Since then, the airline has also offered passenger flights. Panoramic flights over Slovenia are also available.

In March 2016, the Slovenian aviation authority revoked the airline's operations license.

Destinations
As of March 2016, Express Airways served the following airports:

  Croatia
 Split - Split Airport seasonal

  Germany
 Düsseldorf - Düsseldorf Airport seasonal

  Slovenia
 Maribor - Maribor Edvard Rusjan Airport seasonal

As of January 2016, Express Airways had announced several more routes between Germany, Spain and Croatia, which however where cancelled in the meantime.

Fleet
The Express Airways fleet consisted of the following aircraft as of August 2016:

References

External links
 Official website

Defunct airlines of Slovenia
Airlines established in 1999
Airlines disestablished in 2016
Slovenian companies established in 1999